Radio Montserrat known by the callsign ZJB is a Montserratian public radio station broadcasting to the British Overseas Territory of Montserrat. The station broadcasts from studios in the Sweeney's area of the island. The station broadcasts a mixture of music, news and religious programming with some content provided by the BBC World Service.

History
Radio Montserrat was launched in 1952 by Frank Delisle. Initially it was a privately owned venture although it was nationalised in 1957.  Originally broadcast from Olveston the station moved to the capital Plymouth at the same time. 

After the eruption of the Soufrière Hills volcano in 1995 the station was forced to abandon it's studios on Lovers Lane Plymouth and relocate to the safer northern part of the island.

Studios
Radio Montserrat currently broadcasts from a temporary studio complex in the Sweeney's area of the island. New purpose built studios are under construction in the Davy Hill area of the island which will replace the current studios.

Transmitter
Radio Montserrat is broadcast from the Silver Hill transmitter at the very north of the island.

References

External Links
 Official Website

Montserrat
Mass media in British Overseas Territories